This is a list of pretzel companies.   These are notable companies that bake pretzels, or have a major pretzel-based product or service.

By country

Australia
 Parker's

United States

 Auntie Anne's
 Eastern Standard Provisions
 Federal Pretzel Baking Company
 Hot Sam Pretzels
 J & J Snack Foods Corporation (SuperPretzel)
 Nabisco (Mister Salty)
 Pretzelmaker
 Rold Gold
 Snyder's of Hanover
 SuperPretzel
 Tell City Pretzel
 Utz Quality Foods (Utz pretzels)
 We’re Rolling Pretzel Company
 Wetzel's Pretzels
 Wise Foods (Quinlan)

See also

 List of food companies
 List of brand name food products

List of pretzel companies

Pretzel companies